is a mountain south of Ballachulish and Loch Leven in the Scottish Highlands.

The mountain forms a horseshoe shape, with ridges pointing north enclosing the corrie of Gleann a' Chaolais (Glenachulish). The lower slopes on this side are cloaked in conifer plantations. To the south the mountain forms a steep ridge forming the northern wall of Glen Duror, which is also forested.

Climbing

There are several routes up Beinn a' Bheithir. Both summits can be bagged from here, and the walker may descend by the route of ascent.

Other routes on include the north and northwest ridges of Sgorr Dhearg, or a steep ascent from Glen Duror.

Folktale
The mountain at whose base tourists to Glencoe are landed was first called Beinn Ghuilbin but is now known as Beinn Bheithir. By tradition it got this name from a dragon which, long ago, took shelter in Corrie Liath, a great hollow in the face of the mountain and almost right above Ballachulish Pier. This dragon was apparently a terror to the surrounding district. From the lip of the corrie she overlooked the path round the foot of the mountain and, if the unsuspecting traveller attempted to pass by her, she would leap down and tear him to pieces.

No one dared attack her nor could anyone tell how she might be destroyed until Charles, the Skipper, came the way. He anchored his vessel a good distance out from the site of the present pier and, between the vessel and the shore, formed a bridge of empty barrels lashed together with ropes and brisling with iron spikes. When the bridge was finished he kindled a large fire on board the vessel and placed pieces of flesh on the burning embers. As soon as the savour of burning flesh reached the corrie the dragon descended by a succession of leaps to the shore and thence tried to make her way out on the barrels to the vessel. But the spikes entered her body and tore her up so badly that she was nearly dead before she reached the outer edge of the bridge. Meantime the vessel was moved from the bridge until a wide interval was left between it and the last barrel. Over this interval the dragon had not sufficient strength left to leap to the deck of the vessel and, as she could not return the way she came, she died of her wounds where she was, at the end of the bridge.

The people who lived in the neighbourhood of the mountain felt now at peace. But, if they did, little did they know of the new danger which threatened them. The cause of this new danger was a whelp which the old dragon left behind her in Corrie Liath. In course of time the whelp became a full-grown dragon which had a brood of young dragons hidden away in a corn stack at the foot of the mountain. When the farmer discovered them in his stack he at once set fire to it hoping thus to destroy the dangerous vermin it contained. Their shrieking was, with the wind, borne up the mountain-side and, as soon as it reached their mother, down she rushed to their assistance. But she was long in reaching them and in spite of all her efforts they were burned to death. When she saw this she stretched herself on a flat rock near the shore and continued to lash the rock with her tail until she killed herself.

The rock is still known as the Dragon's Rock, and on it Beinn Bheithir House now stood (as reported in 1910).  A writer in 1923 tells that "The  first  house  which  you  pass  after  leaving  the [Ballachulish] pier  is built  on  what  was  known  as  the  Dragon's  Rock,  ...  This  dragon  ... lashed  herself  to  death on  the  rock  now  known  as  the  "Dragon's,"  at  the  foot  of the  mountain,  thenceforth  called  Ben  Vair— the "hill  of  the dragon"."

References

Munros
Marilyns of Scotland
Mountains and hills of the Central Highlands
Mountains and hills of Highland (council area)
One-thousanders of Scotland
Scottish folklore